Rajjakuddin Ahmed (born 2 September 1995) is an Indian cricketer. He made his first-class debut for Assam in the 2017–18 Ranji Trophy on 9 November 2017. He made his Twenty20 debut for Assam in the 2017–18 Zonal T20 League on 8 January 2018. He made his List A debut on 21 February 2021, for Assam in the 2020–21 Vijay Hazare Trophy.

References

External links
 

1995 births
Living people
Indian cricketers
Assam cricketers